Makhmud Sabyrkhan is a Kazakh boxer. He competed at the 2021 AIBA World Boxing Championships, winning the silver medal in the bantamweight event. Sabyrkan was also awarded a gold medal in the 2021 Boxam International Boxing Tournament in Spain, defeating Gabriel Escobar.

References

External links 

Living people
Place of birth missing (living people)
Year of birth missing (living people)
Kazakhstani male boxers
Bantamweight boxers
AIBA World Boxing Championships medalists
Youth and Junior World Boxing Championships medalists
21st-century Kazakhstani people